William Sole (1739–7 February 1802) was a British apothecary and botanist.

The Oxford Dictionary of National Biography states that William Sole was born in 1741 in Little Thetford, Cambridgeshire, However, evidence suggest that he was born in 1739 and Baptised on 28 September in Witchford, Cambridgeshire.

William Sole was the first son of John and Martha Sole. Sometime after his birth, the family moved to  Little Thetford. John and Martha had a further six children. John (baptised 14 June 1741), Sarah (baptised 15 May 1743), Elizabeth (baptised 24 February 1744), Francis (baptised 19 February 1748), Robert (baptised 13 May 1750), Martha (baptised 1752 3 October). In his will dated 15 March 1802, Sole mentions all of his siblings, with the exception of Elizabeth.

Sole studied at King's Ely, then served an apprenticeship as an apothecary in Cambridge.  On qualifying, he moved to Bath, where he practised is profession from premises in Trim Street with partner Thomas West. During their partnership, Sole and West brought at least five apprentices into their business. This partnership ended in 1895 and Sole continued to work alone until his death in 1802.

It is Sole's botanical research that he is most noted for. He specialised in the study of mints, in his garden and by the specimens he collected from a number of places in the United Kingdom.  In 1798, he published Menthae Britannicae, and this was the publication that he became most known for.  He also researched grasses and the local flora of Bath, and was elected as one of the first associates of the Linnean Society.

Sprengel named the genus Solea for Sole, although this was later merged into Hybanthus, or into Pombalia, in recent studies.Juliana de Paula-Souza, Harvey Eugene Ballard, Jr.
Re-establishment of the name Pombalia, and new combinations from the polyphyletic Hybanthus (Violaceae). Phytotaxa. volume 183. number 1. pages 11-15. 

William Sole made his will shortly before his death on 15 January 1802 and left his estate to his siblings living in Cambridgeshire. There is no evidence that he married. He died on 7 February 1802, aged 63, and was buried at Church of St John The Baptist, Batheaston. His grave is unmarked.

References

1739 births
1802 deaths
English apothecaries
18th-century British botanists
People from East Cambridgeshire District
People from Bath, Somerset
People educated at King's Ely